Alta Weiss Hisrich (February 9, 1890 – February 12, 1964), born Alta Weiss, was an American minor league baseball pitcher from Ohio who drew large crowds to exhibition games at minor league and major league venues in the US state of Ohio and Kentucky.  She was a semiprofessional female baseball player who went on to become a physician.

Early life
Born in 1890 in Berlin, Holmes County, Ohio, she was the daughter of Dr. George and Lucinda Zehnder Weiss. When she was five years old the family moved to Ragersville.

Later career
She was the only female to graduate Starling Medical College with the class of 1914.

Weiss married John E. Hisrich in 1926; they separated in 1944.  She died in 1964 in Ragersville, Ohio, just three days after her 74th birthday.

Honors
A picture-story book for children Girl Wonder: A Baseball Story in Nine Innings, by Deborah Hopkinson, with illustrations by Terry Widener, was published in 2003.  On October 20, 2004 she was inducted into the Ragersville Hall of Fame.  Her uniform was sent to the National Baseball Hall of Fame and Museum in Cooperstown, New York for exhibition in a Women's baseball exhibit that opened in 2005.

See also
 Jackie Mitchell – pitched for the Chattanooga Lookouts briefly in 1931, then later with the House of David
 Mamie Johnson – pitched for the Indianapolis Clowns in the 1953–1955 seasons
 Ila Borders – pitched for the St. Paul Saints starting in 1997 then several other teams and retired from minor league baseball in 2000
 Eri Yoshida – pitched for the Kobe 9 Cruise of the Kansai Independent Baseball League starting in the 2009 season and the Chico Outlaws in the 2010 season
Tiffany Brooks
Connie Morgan
Toni Stone
 Women in baseball

References

1890 births
1964 deaths
20th-century American women physicians
20th-century American physicians
Baseball pitchers
American female baseball players
People from Berlin, Holmes County, Ohio
People from Huron County, Ohio
People from Tuscarawas County, Ohio
Baseball players from Ohio
Physicians from Ohio
Ohio State University College of Medicine alumni
20th-century American people